Major League Baseball (MLB) is the highest level of play in North American professional baseball. Founded in 1869, it is composed of 30 teams. Each team in the league has a manager, who is responsible for team strategy and leadership on and off the field. Assisted by various coaches, the manager sets the line-up and starting pitcher before each game, and makes substitutions throughout the game. In early baseball history, it was not uncommon for players to serve as player-managers; that is, they managed the team while still being signed to play for the club. In the history of MLB, there have been 221 player-managers, 59 of whom are in the National Baseball Hall of Fame.

The dual role of player-manager was formerly a common practice, dating back to John Clapp, who performed the task for the Middletown Mansfields in 1872.  One reason for this is that by hiring a player as a manager, the team could save money by paying only one salary. Also, popular players were named player-managers in an effort to boost game attendance. Babe Ruth left the New York Yankees when they refused to allow him to become player-manager. Five of the eight National League (NL) managers in 1934 were also players. Connie Mack, John McGraw, and Joe Torre, among the all-time leaders in managerial wins, made their managerial debuts as player-managers. At least one man served as a player-manager in every major league season from Clapp's debut through 1955.

Today, player-managers have become rare in baseball. Pete Rose is the most recent player-manager, serving from 1984 through 1986 with the Cincinnati Reds. Whereas some player-managers, such as Lou Boudreau, were full-time players as player-managers, by the time Rose became player-manager, he was a part-time player. Rose was trying to prolong his career to break the all-time hit record set by Ty Cobb, and Reds owner Marge Schott used this as a marketing ploy. Rose removed himself from the 40-man roster after the 1986 season to make room for Pat Pacillo, unofficially retiring as a player, but remained as the Reds manager until he was banned from baseball following the release of the Dowd Report in 1989.

One criticism of the practice holds that the manager has enough to be preoccupied with during a game without playing. With specialized bullpens, extensive scouting reports, and increased media scrutiny, the job of a manager has become more complex. A player-manager needs to decide how much playing time to give himself. Don Kessinger, player-manager of the Chicago White Sox in 1979, believes he did not play himself enough. Additionally, Bill Terry felt he became isolated from his team when he became a player-manager.

However, teams continue to consider hiring player-managers. The Toronto Blue Jays considered hiring Paul Molitor as a player-manager in 1997. When approached with the idea in 2000, Barry Larkin reported that he found it "interesting", though general manager (GM) Jim Bowden rejected the idea. In the 2011–12 offseason, the White Sox considered hiring incumbent first baseman Paul Konerko to serve as manager. White Sox GM Kenny Williams said that he believes MLB will again have a player-manager.

List

See also

Player-coach#Player-managers in baseball
List of Major League Baseball managers

References
Bibliography

In-line citations

External links

 

player-managers